The following lists events that happened during 1987 in the Grand Duchy of Luxembourg.

Incumbents

Events
 28 March – A large rally is held in Luxembourg City to protest pension disparity, leading to the founding on 12 May of the Action Committee 5/6 Pensions for Everyone.
 9 May – Representing Luxembourg, Plastic Bertrand finishes third in the Eurovision Song Contest 1987 with the song Amour Amour.
 27 May – Prince Jean marries Helene Vestur.

Births
 24 April – Anne Bourg, footballer

Deaths
 12 February – Raymond Vouel, politician
 October – Ketty Thull, writer

References

 
Years of the 20th century in Luxembourg
Luxembourg